In algebraic group theory, a wonderful compactification of a variety acted on by an algebraic group  is a -equivariant compactification such that the closure of each orbit is smooth.    constructed a wonderful compactification of any symmetric variety given by a quotient  of an algebraic group  by the subgroup   fixed by some involution  of  over the complex numbers, sometimes called the De Concini–Procesi compactification, and  generalized this construction to arbitrary characteristic. In particular, by writing a group  itself as a symmetric homogeneous space,  (modulo the diagonal subgroup), this gives a wonderful compactification of the group  itself.

References

 

Algebraic groups
Compactification (mathematics)